Réjaumont may refer to the following places in France:

Réjaumont, Gers, a commune in the Gers department 
Réjaumont, Hautes-Pyrénées, a commune in the Hautes-Pyrénées department